An edit decision list or EDL is used in the post-production process of film editing and video editing. The list contains an ordered list of reel and timecode data representing where each video clip can be obtained in order to conform the final cut.

EDLs are created by offline editing systems, or can be paper documents constructed by hand such as shot logging. These days, linear video editing systems have been superseded by non-linear editing (NLE) systems which can output EDLs electronically to allow autoconform on an online editing system – the recreation of an edited programme from the original sources (usually video tapes) and the editing decisions in the EDL.

They are also often used in the digital video editing world, so rather than referring to reels they can refer to sequences of images stored on disk.

Some formats, such as CMX3600, can represent simple editing decisions only. Final Cut Pro XML, the Advanced Authoring Format (AAF), and AviSynth scripts are relatively advanced file formats that can contain sophisticated EDLs.

B-Roll 
Linear editing systems cannot dissolve between clips on the same video tape. Hence, one of these clips will need to be dubbed onto a new video tape. EDLs designate these occurrences by marking such dissolves' source reels as B-roll of "b-reels". For example, the EDL will change the 8th character of the reel name to the letter B.

However, sometimes editors will (confusingly) use the letter B to designate time code breaks on a video tape. If there is broken time code on a video tape, there will be two (or more) instances of a particular time code on the video tape. When re-capturing, it can be ambiguous as to which timecode is the right one. The letter B may indicate that the right time code is from the second set of timecode on the video tape.

Incompatibilities and potential problems
EDL formats such as CMX, GVG, Sony, Final Cut Pro, and Avid are similar but can differ in small (but important) ways.  Particular attention should be paid to reel naming convention. On the Avid, reel names can be up to 32 characters, but user should be aware that these EDLs don't adhere to online editing machine control specifications. These are used by systems that have modified the import/export code to handle file-based workflows as tape acquisition formats wane. On FCP, in CMX3600 format, only eight characters are allowed. Particular attention should be paid towards b-reels.  If the EDL handles dissolves to the same reel, reel names should be limited to 7 characters since the 8th character may be replaced.

EDLs can use either drop-frame (DF) or non drop-frame timecode (NDF), running at 24fps (non drop-frame only), 25fps (non drop-frame only), and 30fps (drop-frame and non drop-frame).

Overall, EDLs are still commonly used as some systems do not support other more robust formats such as AAF and XML.

Systems known to support EDL to some extent 
Almost any professional editing system and many others support some form of XML/EDL saving/processing.

Some that make the list:
 Adobe Premiere Pro
 Avid Media Composer
DaVinci Resolve
 Blender supports EDL in versions 2.4x and versions from 2.66
 Cinelerra 
 Digital Vision Nucoda and Phoenix
 Thydrjs Dream II and Xynergi systems
 Final Cut Pro
 Lightworks
 MediaCoder
 Shotcut
 The Foundry HIERO
Rally Access

Systems supporting EDL playback, not just EDL cutting 
Probably most of the above, plus any professional editing system, plus

 Avidemux project files.
 Bs.player 
 MPlayer (EDL specifies what to skip or mute; only one source file per EDL; see also http://linuxgazette.net/178/brownss.html)
 MPlayer2 (EDL specifies what to show from which file)
 mpv (EDL specifies what to show from which file; different from MPlayer and MPlayer2)
 MythTV cut list
 SageTV
 SMPlayer automatically loads and applies a matching EDL file to the current movie being played
 VLC media player with xspf files that specify start and end times, or with movie content editor
 Kodi/XBMC
 Zoom Player Max
 mrViewer with reels files, which are plain ASCII files.

See also
AES31
Keykode (Film editing)
Commercial skipping sometimes uses EDLs to track commercial blocks.
Magisto

External links 
  The CMX 3600 EDL specification
 Guide to EDL Management - Brooks Harris
 OpenTimelineIO - An open-source data model, file format, and API implementing reading and writing of many EDLs types.
 Sensible cinema A "universal" EDL player.
 edledit A Python-based GUI program to create MPlayer EDL v1 files.
 EDL Ease A program that parses EDL files, converts to Excel and CSV formats and summarizes durations of all sources and filenames used in a project sequence.

References 

Film and video technology
Film editing
Television terminology
Film and video terminology